AEDC Ballistic Range S-3 is a single stage air gun owned by the United States Air Force. The gun is commonly used for bird strike testing and is often called a chicken gun.

History 
The first Range S-3 was developed by Eugene Sanders at the Arnold Engineering Development Complex for use in aircraft canopy testing. The gun validated many of the canopies designs used on fighter aircraft over the last several decades. The range also played an instrumental role in developing the ASTM F330 specification: Standard Test Method for Bird Impact Testing of Aerospace Transparent Enclosures.

Capabilities
The gun uses a large compressed air reservoir to launch a projectile out of a  diameter barrel. Launch speeds of  can be attained. The barrel can also be reconfigured to launch square or rectangle projectiles. The most commonly used projectile is a dead chicken prepared in accordance with the ASTM specification.

See also 
 Arnold Engineering Development Complex
 Ballistics
 NASA Chicken Gun

References

External links
 Arnold Engineering Development Center (official)
 Arnold Engineering Development Center at GlobalSecurity.org

Air guns of the United States
Aviation safety